Congochromis is a genus of small cichlids native to river basins in Middle Africa.

Species
There are currently five recognized species in this genus:
 Congochromis dimidiatus (Pellegrin, 1900)
 Congochromis pugnatus Stiassny & Schliewen, 2007
 Congochromis robustus Lamboj, 2012
 Congochromis sabinae (Lamboj, 2005)
 Congochromis squamiceps (Boulenger, 1902)

References

Chromidotilapiini